Coming Soon are a French indie band founded in 2005. Their latest album is Sentimental Jukebox 2018.

Discography 

 The Escort (EP) 2006
 New Grids 2007
 Love In the Afternoon (EP) 2009
 Ghost Train Tragedy 2009
 B-Sides & Rarities vol. 1 et vol. 2 et vol. 3  (EP) 2011
 Dark Spring  2012
 Disappear Here (EP) 2013
 Tiger Meets Lion 2014
 Sun Gets In (EP) 2015
 Sentimental Jukebox  2018

References 

French rock music groups
French indie pop groups
French folk rock groups
Anti-folk groups
Musical groups established in 2005
2005 establishments in France